The Abadina virus (ABAV) is a serotype of Palyam virus in the genus Orbivirus belonging to the Palyam serogroup.  It was considered a distinct species of virus until 1984. The Abadina virus was first detected in 1967 from Culicoides. 

The virus is isolated from Culicoides sp.

References

Orbiviruses
Infraspecific virus taxa